Kup  (German Kupp) is a village in the administrative district of Gmina Dobrzeń Wielki, within Opole County, Opole Voivodeship, in south-western Poland.

The village has a population of 1,200.

References

Kup